Brian Frederick Staunton (1931 – 2021) was an Australian former rugby league footballer who played in the 1950s.

Playing career
Staunton started his career at Manly Warringah Sea Eagles. He played with them for three years, starting in 1952 when he played five-eighth in the 3rd-Grade Premiership-winning team. He then moved to Balmain Tigers for four years between 1955–1958 and captained them in the 1956 Grand Final. Staunton scored 2 tries in the grand final as St George Dragons defeated Balmain 18–12.  The victory would start St George on their 11-straight premiership-winning run.

References

1931 births
2021 deaths
Manly Warringah Sea Eagles players
Balmain Tigers players
Australian rugby league players
Rugby league halfbacks
Rugby league players from Sydney